Real Sporting, a Spanish football club, has played in European football since 1979, in the UEFA Cup. The club participated in six editions, only advancing one stage in two of them.

Overall record

Source:

Individual records

Source:

Matches played

1978–79 UEFA Cup

Round of 64

Round of 32

1979–80 UEFA Cup

Round of 64

1980–81 UEFA Cup

Round of 64

1985–86 UEFA Cup

Round of 64

1987–88 UEFA Cup

Round of 64

1991–92 UEFA Cup

Round of 64

Round of 32

Notes

References

External links
Official website
Real Sporting at UEFA.com

Sporting de Gijón
Sporting